Devils of Monza (also known as Sacrilege) is a 1987 Italian historical erotic-drama film directed by Luciano Odorisio. It is loosely based on real life events of Marianna de Leyva, better known as "The Nun of Monza", whose story was made  famous by the Alessandro Manzoni's novel The Betrothed.

Cast 

Myriem Roussel as  Sister Virginia Maria de Leyva
Alessandro Gassman as Giampaolo Osio
Renato De Carmine as Cardinal Federico Borromeo 
Augusto Zucchi as Father Paolo
 Cyrus Elias as Giuseppe Molteno
 Flaminia Lizzani as Sister Benedetta
 Almerica Schiavo as Sister Ottavia

Release
Devils of Monza was released on home video in the United Kingdom in December 1987.

References

External links

1980s erotic drama films
Italian erotic drama films
Films directed by Luciano Odorisio
Nunsploitation films
Films scored by Pino Donaggio
Films about clerical celibacy
Italian historical drama films
1980s historical drama films
1987 drama films
1987 films
Cultural depictions of Italian women
1980s Italian-language films
1980s Italian films